Lengshuijiang is an urban subdistrict and the seat of Lengshuijiang City in Hunan, China. The subdistrict is located in the west central part of the city, it is bordered by Shatangwan Subdistrict to the east and southeast, Buxi Subdistrict to the south and southwest, Zhonglian Township to the northwest and north.

History
In September 1981, Lengshuijiang Subdistrict was reorganized from the historic Lengshuijiang Town which was formed in June 1950. The town was a part of Zhonglian Commune in the people's commune movement in 1958; dividing a part of the former Zhonglian Commune, Wiyi City People's Commune  was established in 1961. Wiyi City People's Commune was reorganized to Lengshuijiang Town in January 1963, the town once again was changed to Lengjiang Commune in 1968 and the commune was reformed to Lengshuijiang Town in the next year.

Administrative division
The subdistrict is divided into 11 community and 4 villages, the following areas: 
 Tidu Community
 Xinqiao Community
 Jianxin Community
 Lengjin Community
 Lengxi Community
 Lengxin Community
 Lengyuan Community
 Lenggang Community
 Lianxiqiao Community
 Shitang Community
 Hongri Community
 Tongxin Village
 Baiyang Village
 Baishi Village
 Yongxing Village

Geography
Zi River, also known as the mother river, flows through the subdistrict.

Transportation

Provincial Highway
The subdistrict is connected to Provincial Highway S312, which heads northwest to Xinhua County and southeast to Shatangwan Subdistrict and Jinzhushan Town.

Railway
The Shanghai–Kunming railway, from Shanghai to Kunming, southwest China's Yunnan province, through the subdistrict.

References

Divisions of Lengshuijiang